Gilberdyke railway station is a railway station that serves the village of Gilberdyke in the East Riding of Yorkshire, England. It was opened in 1840 by the Hull and Selby Railway, and until 1974 it was known as Staddlethorpe station. Today it is operated by the Northern train operating company.

History
Staddlethorpe station was opened by the Hull and Selby Railway in 1840. The original facilities included a water station, with a  reservoir and pumping engine.

In 1842 a train guard slipped in wet weather, falling off the platform under moving coal wagons, resulting in very serious injuries leading to his death. In 1850 a train from Hull to Normanton had one of its engine's boilers explode near the station. Both the driver and fireman were badly scalded, and the fireman broke a leg.

In 1869 the Hull and Doncaster Branch opened, branching south-westwards from a junction just west of the station.

At around the end of the 19th century a goods shed, and sidings serving a creosote works were established south of the station. In the same period the line through here and on towards Brough was increased to four tracks. The reservoir was filled in during 1903.  In 1987, the platform loop lines were removed (reducing the line to two tracks again) and the platforms themselves extended outwards to reach the remaining running lines.

The works and area south of the station was redeveloped as an industrial estate in the 1970.

In 2006 a planning application was accepted for the demolition of the goods shed and the erection of three industrial units split into eighteen smaller business units.

Present
Railway buildings that still exist include the Station Master's house and two adjacent cottages, and, on Broad Lane, a number of terraced cottages known as Station Cottages. The sidings south of the station have been replaced by an industrial estate "Gateway Business Park".

The station is now an unmanned halt and has no ticketing facilities – passengers must purchase these on the train or prior to travel.  Shelters are located on each platform, along with digital information screens.  Train running details can also be obtained by telephone and timetable posters.

The station does not have step free access to the westbound platform (as it is accessible only via footbridge), meaning that disabled passengers should book assistance in advance or travel via Brough station where step free access is available.

Services 

The station is operated by Northern. This is the 1K04 service leaving Hull at 05:06 Monday to Saturday calling at Gilberdyke at 05:25 in the December 2019 timetable.

On Sundays there is an hourly service to Hull and Doncaster.

References

External links 

Railway stations in the East Riding of Yorkshire
DfT Category F2 stations
Former Hull and Selby Railway stations
Railway stations in Great Britain opened in 1840
Railway stations served by TransPennine Express
Northern franchise railway stations